The electoral history of Joe Biden, the 46th and current president of the United States, began in 1970. Biden served as the 47th vice president (2009–2017), and as a United States senator from Delaware (1973–2009). Biden is the oldest elected and serving president, the second Catholic president, after John F. Kennedy, and the first president from Delaware.

A member of the Democratic Party, Biden was elected to the New Castle County Council in 1970, and became the sixth-youngest senator in American history when he was elected to the U.S. Senate from Delaware in 1972, at the age of 29. He was re-elected to the Senate six times, and was the fourth-most senior senator. He ran unsuccessfully for the Democratic presidential nomination in both 1988 and 2008.

In January 2009, Biden resigned from the Senate, to serve as Barack Obama's vice president, after they won the 2008 presidential election. They were re-elected to a second term in 2012. 

Biden announced his candidacy in the 2020 presidential election on April 25, 2019. A total of 29 major candidates declared their candidacies for the primaries, the largest field of presidential candidates for any American political party since 1972; but over time, the field narrowed down to Biden and Senator Bernie Sanders from Vermont. Eventually, Sanders withdrew from the race, and Biden became the presumptive Democratic nominee in April 2020. Biden reached the delegate threshold needed to secure the nomination in June 2020. He defeated incumbent president Donald Trump in the general election, with 306 electoral votes to Trump's 232. Biden received more than 81 million votes, the most votes ever cast for a candidate in a U.S. presidential election.

County council election (1970)

U.S. Senate elections (1972–2008)

1972

1978

1984

1990

1996

2002

2008

Presidential primaries (1984–1988)

1984

1988

Presidential elections

2008

New Hampshire primary

Primaries 
Excluding penalized contests, only primary and caucuses votes:

Including penalized contests:

Nomination

General election

2012

Nomination

General election

2020

Primaries

Nomination

General election

See also 

 Electoral history of Kamala Harris
 Electoral history of Barack Obama
 Electoral history of Hillary Clinton
 Electoral history of Sarah Palin
 Electoral history of John McCain
 Electoral history of John Edwards
 Electoral history of Bill Richardson
 Electoral history of Mike Gravel
 Electoral history of Christopher Dodd
 Electoral history of Paul Ryan
 Electoral history of Mitt Romney

Notes

References 

Joe Biden
Biden, Joe
Biden, Joe
Biden, Joe